Lukáš Ticháček (born 12 January 1982) is a Czech professional volleyball player with Polish citizenship, a former member of the Czech Republic national team. A bronze medalist at the 2013 European League, and the 2006–07 CEV Champions League winner.

Personal life
In 2014, he married Paulina. On 24 July 2015, his wife gave birth to their first child, a daughter named Mia.

Career

Clubs
On 11 May 2011, he signed a two–year contract with Asseco Resovia. During these two years, he won two Polish Champion titles (2012, 2013). In 2013, his contract was extended for the next two years. On 29 March 2015, Resovia, including Ticháček, won the 2014–15 CEV Champions League silver medal, losing in the final to Zenit Kazan. In April 2015, he signed a next two–year contract until 2017.

Honours
 CEV Champions League
  2006/2007 – with VfB Friedrichshafen
  2014/2015 – with Asseco Resovia

 CEV Cup
  2011/2012 – with Asseco Resovia

 National championships
 2002/2003  Czech Championship, with Dukla Liberec
 2006/2007  German Cup, with VfB Friedrichshafen
 2006/2007  German Championship, with VfB Friedrichshafen
 2007/2008  German Cup, with VfB Friedrichshafen
 2007/2008  German Championship, with VfB Friedrichshafen
 2008/2009  German Championship, with VfB Friedrichshafen
 2009/2010  German Championship, with VfB Friedrichshafen
 2010/2011  German Championship, with VfB Friedrichshafen
 2011/2012  Polish Championship, with Asseco Resovia
 2012/2013  Polish Championship, with Asseco Resovia
 2013/2014  Polish SuperCup, with Asseco Resovia
 2014/2015  Polish Championship, with Asseco Resovia
 2020/2021  Czech Championship, with ČEZ Karlovarsko

References

External links

 
 Player profile at PlusLiga.pl 
 Player profile at Volleybox.net 

1982 births
Living people
Sportspeople from Přerov
Naturalized citizens of Poland
Czech men's volleyball players
Czech expatriate sportspeople in Germany
Expatriate volleyball players in Germany
Czech expatriate sportspeople in Poland
Expatriate volleyball players in Poland
Resovia (volleyball) players
MKS Będzin players
Gwardia Wrocław players
Setters (volleyball)